Simon Antony Wigg (15 October 1960 – 15 November 2000) was an English speedway, grasstrack and longtrack rider who won five World Long Track Championships and finished runner-up in the Speedway World Championship in 1989.

Education
Wigg went to school at the John Hampden School in High Wycombe. Leaving in 1977 after taking his O'levels. After relocating with his family several times as a child, he gained a scholarship to Woodbridge School in Suffolk, where he and his brother began their interest in motorcycle racing, attending Ipswich Witches meetings at Foxhall and riding in grasstrack competitions.

Career
Wigg was born in Aylesbury, Buckinghamshire. 
In 1980 later he joined his first speedway club, Weymouth Wildcats. In 1982, Wigg won the British League Division Two Pairs Championship with Martin Yeates, and in 1984 qualified for his first World Final. 

In 1984 he was signed by Oxford Cheetahs who bought him from Cradley Heath Heathens for £25,000. The Oxford team had returned to the British League and the other signings to start as the top five riders for the season were Hans Nielsen for a record £30,000, Marvyn Cox for £15,000, Melvyn Taylor for £12,000 and Jens Rasmussen, with Ian Clark and Nigel Sparshott at 6 & 7. After a mid table finish in 1984 he was part of the Oxford team that won the league and cup double during a 1985 British League season. Also in 1985 he became the second British World Longtrack Champion (Michael Lee was the first in 1981) and went on to win the title a further four times. He was the most successful British grasstrack and longtrack rider ever. 

Wigg while riding in Oxford met his wife to be, Charlie, and after a few years together they had two children. In 1986 Wigg was part of the Oxford team that won a second consecutive league and cup double during the 1986 British League season.

1988 saw him become British Speedway Champion and he retained the title the following year. 1989 also saw him captain the Great Britain speedway team when they won the World Team Cup. In 1989, he finished runner-up to his Cheetahs teammate Hans Nielsen in the World Final at the Olympiastadion in Munich. His team Oxford also won the league title in the 1989 British League season.

He rode in the Polish League for Unia Tarnów in 1992 (10 matches, CMA 9.89), Unia Leszno (1994, 2 matches, 6.80), Stal Rzeszów (1997, 1 match, 11.00) and Falubaz Zielona Góra (1998, 1 match, 6.40). 

In October 1996, during the Speedway Grand Prix Qualification he won the GP Challenge, which ensured that he claimed a permanent slot for the 1997 Grand Prix.

During his career, Wigg was a frequent visitor to Australia and always enjoyed success on the larger Showground tracks down under such as the  Brisbane Exhibition Ground, the  Wayville Showground in Adelaide, the  Claremont Speedway in Perth, and the  Melbourne Showgrounds. During his time riding in both Australia and New Zealand, Wigg won the Australian Long track Grand Prix in 1990, 1994 and 1995, as well as the New Zealand Long track Grand Prix in 1994.

Wigg was also famous for his bright green leathers and bikes, being nicknamed "The Lean Green Racing Machine". He rode in 65 meetings for England.

Death
After suffering epileptic seizures in November 1998 and January 1999, which were originally attributed to head trauma from racing crashes, he was diagnosed with a brain tumour, and had surgery to remove it in May 1999. After recovering, he moved with his family to Gold Coast, Queensland, but after falling ill again in February 2000, returned to the UK for further surgery after discovering that the tumour had regrown. Wigg died on 15 November 2000 at the age of 40.

World Longtrack Championship record

Five Times Champion

Final

 1982  Esbjerg 5pts (13th)
 1983  Marianske Lazne 11pts (7th)
 1985  Esbjerg 22pts (Champion)
 1987  Mühldorf 21pts (Second)
 1988  Scheeßel 21pts (8th)
 1989  Marianske Lazne 38pts (Champion)
 1990  Herxheim 37pts (Champion)
 1991  Marianske Lazne 10pts (9th)
 1992  Pfarrkirchen 0pts (19th)
 1993  Mühldorf 22pts (Champion)
 1994  Marianske Lazne 25pts (Champion)
 1995  Scheeßel 20pts (Second) * After run-off with Kelvin Tatum
 1996  Herxheim 11pts (7th)

Grand Years

1998 Four G.P. 40pts (10th)

World Speedway final appearances

World Championship
 1984 -  Göteborg, Ullevi - 6th - 9pts
 1988 -  Vojens, Speedway Center - 6th - 9pts
 1989 -  Munich, Olympic Stadium - 2nd - 12pts + 3pts

World Pairs Championship
 1986 -  Pocking, Rottalstadion (with Jeremy Doncaster) - 7th - 23pts (11)
 1987 -  Pardubice, Svítkov Stadion (with Kelvin Tatum) - 2nd - 44pts (20)

World Team Cup
 1984 -  Leszno, Alfred Smoczyk Stadium (with Chris Morton / Peter Collins / Phil Collins / Neil Collins) - 2nd - 24pts (9)
 1986 -  Göteborg, Ullevi,  Vojens, Speedway Center and  Bradford, Odsal Stadium (with Kelvin Tatum / Neil Evitts / Jeremy Doncaster / Chris Morton / Marvyn Cox) - 3rd - 81pts (24)
 1987 -  Fredericia, Fredericia Speedway,  Coventry, Brandon Stadium and  Prague, Marketa Stadium (with Kelvin Tatum / Jeremy Doncaster / Simon Cross / Marvyn Cox)  - 2nd - 101pts (29)
 1988 -  Long Beach, Veterans Memorial Stadium (with Simon Cross / Kelvin Tatum / Chris Morton / Gary Havelock) - 4th - 22pts (0)
 1989 -  Bradford, Odsal Stadium (with Jeremy Doncaster / Kelvin Tatum / Paul Thorp / Simon Cross) - Winner - 48pts (11)
 1990 -  Pardubice, Svítkov Stadion (with Kelvin Tatum / Jeremy Doncaster / Marvyn Cox / Gary Havelock) - 2nd - 34pts (8)

Speedway Grand Prix results

British Grasstrack Championship Record
1981 - British 500cc Grasstrack @ Coxwold, Clyst St. Mary & Uckington
1982 - British Masters Grasstrack @ Condover & Exeter
1983 - British Masters Grasstrack @ Clyst St George & Long Marston
1985 - British Masters Grasstrack @ Eaton
1989 - British Masters Grasstrack @ Chetton & Winterbourne Gunner
1990 - British Masters Grasstrack @ Sturminster Marshall & Chetton

References

External links
A tribute to Simon Wigg
Simon Wigg Memorial
Simon Wigg at grasstrackgb.co.uk

1960 births
2000 deaths
British speedway riders
English motorcycle racers
British Speedway Championship winners
Oxford Cheetahs riders
King's Lynn Stars riders
Birmingham Brummies riders
Cradley Heathens riders
Bradford Dukes riders
Sportspeople from Aylesbury
Exeter Falcons riders
Wimbledon Dons riders
People educated at Woodbridge School
Deaths from brain cancer in the United Kingdom
Individual Speedway Long Track World Championship riders
People educated at John Hampden Grammar School